Eupogonius pubicollis is a species of beetle in the family Cerambycidae. It was described by Melzer in 1933. It is known from Honduras and Panama.

References

Eupogonius
Beetles described in 1933